Westport High School was a public high school located at 315 East 39th Street in Kansas City, Missouri. It was part of the Kansas City, Missouri School District.  A trowel was used to lay the cornerstone of the school on June 8, 1907. The Class of 1957 presented a frame with the exact trowel on October 6, 2007 to coincide with their 50th anniversary and the 100th anniversary of the school. Westport closed in 2010; its building was listed on the National Register of Historic Places in 2015.

History 

The school was established in the 19th-century, moving into its own building in 1891 with an 1897 addition coming subsequently, and joining the Kansas City school system in 1898 as Westport was annexed to Kansas City. The high school was across the street from Westport Middle School and it opened in the fall of 1908. It was considered the finest school in Kansas City and among the finest in the county, at a cost of nearly $500,000, and built of stone and vitrified brick.

Westport High School was the last school to become Achievement First in 2009-2010. The purpose was to prepare students for post-secondary education and high-quality careers.

School closing 
Westport High closed on June 3, 2010, because of school district Superintendent John Covington's right-sizing plan to close almost 30 schools. Mr. Harold Hawkins was the last principal of Westport High due to the school closing. He was called out of retirement to become principal on April 7, 2009.

After Westport closed in 2010, Southwest Early College Campus took the attendance zone of Westport.

Yearbook
The Herald was the name of the school yearbook.

The 2007-2008 yearbook was the first yearbook to be a DVD. The 2008-2009 yearbook was the second yearbook to be a DVD and the first in HD.

Newspaper
The Weekly Crier was the name of the school newspaper.

Student activities

 Student Council
 National Honor Society
 JROTC
 Drill Team
 Choir
 Debate
 Cheerleading
 Tutoring
 Various stage activities
Westport's last ROTC programs or drill teams were in the mid to late 1940s. 
There was a chapter of the Future Teachers of America.

Principal

Partners in community service
Westport High School and Herndon Career Center were partners in community service with SkillsUSA, FBLA, and FCCLA. April 28, 2007 marked the first community service project for Westport and Herndon Career Center from Raytown, Missouri. The theme was "Restoring Westport High". April 19, 2008 marked the second community service project for both schools. The theme was "Schools Helping Schools."

Notable alumni
Sumner Blossom, editor of  American Magazine
Walt Bodine, Kansas City broadcaster
Betty Caywood, 1948, one of first female MLB radio commentators when she was at the mike for Kansas City Athletics broadcasts in 1964
Friz Freleng, 1923, animator and film director for Warner Bros. Cartoons and others 
 Hugh Harman, 1922, animator, film director, and producer. Created Looney Tunes and Merrie Melodies.
Ewing Kauffman, 1934, pharmaceutical executive and owner of Kansas City Royals
Bob O'Brien, professional basketball player
Bruce Pickens, former professional American football player, NFL Draft 1991 / Round: 1 / Pick: 3
Brandon Rush, NBA guard for Golden State Warriors

References

External links

Westport High School History - Kansas City Library
Class of 1957 Reunion
Class of 1958

High schools in Kansas City, Missouri
1891 establishments in Missouri
Public high schools in Missouri
School buildings on the National Register of Historic Places in Missouri
National Register of Historic Places in Kansas City, Missouri